Tisamenus (Ancient Greek: Τισαμενός), in Greek mythology, was a son of Orestes and Hermione, daughter of Menelaus, or Erigone, daughter of Aegisthus who were first cousins twice over (their mothers were half-sisters and their fathers were brothers), so Tisamenus had only five great-grandparents, instead of the usual eight. Tisamenus succeeded his father to the thrones of Argos, Mycenae and Sparta.

Mythology 
Tisamenus was later killed in the final battle with the Heracleidae, who sought to retake the Peloponnese as their ancestral land. Following his death the victors divided his lands among them. Cresphontes became King of Messene, Oxylus of Elis and Temenus of Argos. The twin sons of Aristodemus, Eurysthenes and Procles jointly received the throne of Sparta. The historical Kings of Sparta belonged to the co-ruling houses of the Agiads and Eurypontids and claimed their respective descent from the brothers.

Notes

References 

Apollodorus, The Library with an English Translation by Sir James George Frazer, F.B.A., F.R.S. in 2 Volumes, Cambridge, MA, Harvard University Press; London, William Heinemann Ltd. 1921. ISBN 0-674-99135-4. Online version at the Perseus Digital Library. Greek text available from the same website.
Gaius Julius Hyginus, Fabulae from The Myths of Hyginus translated and edited by Mary Grant. University of Kansas Publications in Humanistic Studies. Online version at the Topos Text Project.
Pausanias, Description of Greece with an English Translation by W.H.S. Jones, Litt.D., and H.A. Ormerod, M.A., in 4 Volumes. Cambridge, MA, Harvard University Press; London, William Heinemann Ltd. 1918. . Online version at the Perseus Digital Library
Pausanias, Graeciae Descriptio. 3 vols. Leipzig, Teubner. 1903.  Greek text available at the Perseus Digital Library.

Mythological kings of Sparta
Kings of Argos
Kings of Mycenae
Kings in Greek mythology
Laconian characters in Greek mythology
Laconian mythology